Sabanalarga (Spanish for "Long Plain") is a municipality in the Atlántico Department, Colombia. Founded in 1620 by Lucas Dionisio Tesillo y Diego and Marceliano de Jesús Almanza. It became a municipality in 1680.

Geography

Sabanalarga is located in the middle of the Atlántico Department. It is surrounded to the north by the municipalities of Usiacurí, Baranoa, and Polonuevo; to the east by the municipality of Ponedera; to the south by the municipalities of Candelaria, and Manatí; to the southwest by the municipality of Repelón and to the west by the municipalities of Luruaco and Piojó.

Notable people
 Juana de J. Sarmiento (1899-1979), politician, activist
 Mauro Manotas  (1995-) Football player for Tijuana

References

External links
 Sabanalarga official website
 Gobernacion del Atlantico - Sabanalarga

Municipalities of Atlántico Department
1620 establishments in the Spanish Empire